is a railway station in the city of Anjō, Aichi, Japan, operated by Meitetsu.

Lines

Station layout
The station has a single side platform serving bi-directional traffic, connected to a small station building with rounded walls.

Adjacent stations

Station history
Hekikai Electric Railway merged with the Meitetsu Group on May 1, 1944. The station was reconstructed in 2007, and was renamed to its present name on June 29, 2008.

Passenger statistics
In fiscal 2017, the station was used by an average of 479 passengers daily (boarding passengers only).

Surrounding area
Futago Kofun

See also
 List of Railway Stations in Japan

References

External links

 Official web page 

Railway stations in Japan opened in 1926
Railway stations in Aichi Prefecture
Stations of Nagoya Railroad
Anjō, Aichi